In Greek mythology, Moros /ˈmɔːrɒs/ or Morus /ˈmɔːrəs/ (Ancient Greek: Μόρος means 'doom, fate') is the 'hateful' personified spirit of impending doom, who drives mortals to their deadly fate. It was also said that Moros gave people the ability to foresee their death. His Roman equivalent was Fatum.

Family 
Moros is the offspring of Nyx, the primordial goddess of the night. It is suggested by Roman authors that Moros was sired by Erebus, primordial god of darkness. However, in Hesiod's Theogony it is suggested that Nyx bore him by herself, along with several of her other children.

Regardless of the presence or absence of Moros' father, this would make him the brother of the Moirai, or the Fates. Among his other siblings are Thanatos and the Keres, death spirits who represented the physical aspects of death—Keres being the bringers of violent death and terminal sickness, while Thanatos represents a more peaceful passing.

Hesiod's account 

And Nyx (Night) bore hateful Moros (Doom) and black Ker (Violent Death) and Thanatos (Death), and she bore Hypnos (Sleep) and the tribe of Oneiroi (Dreams). And again the goddess murky Night, though she lay with none, bare Momos (Blame) and painful Oizys (Misery) and the Hesperides who guard the rich, golden apples and the trees bearing fruit beyond glorious Ocean. Also she bore the Moirai (Destinies) and ruthless avenging Keres (Death Fates), Clotho and Lachesis and Atropos, who give men at their birth both evil and good to have, and they pursue the transgressions of men and of gods: and these goddesses never cease from their dread anger until they punish the sinner with a sore penalty. Also deadly Night bore Nemesis (Indignation) to afflict mortal men, and after her, Apate (Deceit) and Philotes (Friendship) and hateful Geras (Old age) and hard-hearted Eris (Strife).

Hyginus's account 

From Nox/ Nyx (Night) and Erebus [were born]: Fatum/ Moros (Fate), Senectus/ Geras (Old Age), Mors/ Thanatos (Death), Letum (Dissolution), Continentia/ Sophrosyne (Moderation), Somnus/ Hypnos (Sleep), Somnia/ Oneiroi (Dreams), Amor (Love)--that is Lysimeles, Epiphron (Prudence), Porphyrion, Epaphus, Discordia/ Eris (Discord), Miseria/ Oizys (Misery), Petulantia/ Hybris (Wantonness), Nemesis (Envy), Euphrosyne (Good Cheer), Amicitia/ Philotes (Friendship), Misericordia/ Eleos (Compassion), Styx (Hatred); the three Parcae/ Moirai (Fates), namely Clotho, Lachesis and Atropos; the Hesperides.

Cicero's account 

Their [Aether and Hemera's] brothers and sisters, whom the ancient genealogists name Amor/ Eros (Love), Dolus (Guile), Metus/ Deimos (Fear), Labor/ Ponus (Toil), Invidentia/ Nemesis (Envy), Fatum/ Moros (Fate), Senectus/ Geras (Old Age), Mors/ Thanatos (Death), Tenebrae/ Keres (Darkness), Miseria/ Oizys (Misery), Querella/ Momus (Complaint), Gratia/ Philotes (Favour), Fraus/ Apate (Fraud), Pertinacia (Obstinacy), the Parcae/ Moirai (Fates), the Hesperides, the Somnia/ Oneiroi (Dreams): all of these are fabled to be the children of Erebus (Darkness) and Nox/ Nyx (Night).

Mythology 
In Prometheus Bound, the titular Titan suggests that he gave humanity the spirit Elpis, meaning hope, in order to help them ignore the inevitability of Moros. He is also referred to as "the all-destroying god, who, even in the realm of Death, does not set his victim free," further supporting his image as representative of the inevitability of death and suffering.

Aeschylus' account 
Aeschylus, Fragment 199 (from Plutarch, Life and Poety of Homer 157) (trans. Weir Smyth):

"A man dies not for the many wounds that pierce his breast, unless it be that life's end keep pace with death, nor by sitting on his hearth at home doth he the more escape his appointed doom (peprômenon moros)."

The word moros is not personified here but the passage provides a clear picture of the concept.

In popular culture
Moros will be a character in the upcoming game Hades II published by Supergiant Games. His role in the game is currently unknown.

Legacy
Dinosaur species Moros intrepidus is named after Moros.

Notes

References 

 Gaius Julius Hyginus, Fabulae from The Myths of Hyginus translated and edited by Mary Grant. University of Kansas Publications in Humanistic Studies. Online version at the Topos Text Project.
 Hesiod, Theogony from The Homeric Hymns and Homerica with an English Translation by Hugh G. Evelyn-White, Cambridge, MA.,Harvard University Press; London, William Heinemann Ltd. 1914. Online version at the Perseus Digital Library. Greek text available from the same website.
 Marcus Tullius Cicero, Nature of the Gods from the Treatises of M.T. Cicero translated by Charles Duke Yonge (1812-1891), Bohn edition of 1878. Online version at the Topos Text Project.
 Marcus Tullius Cicero, De Natura Deorum. O. Plasberg. Leipzig. Teubner. 1917.  Latin text available at the Perseus Digital Library.

Greek gods
Time and fate gods
Greek primordial deities
Personifications in Greek mythology
Children of Nyx
Personifications